Smyra is a genus of moths of the family Erebidae. The genus was erected by Heinrich Benno Möschler in 1880.

Species
Smyra aexonia (H. Druce, 1890) Panama
Smyra chlorolimbis Möschler, 1880 Suriname
Smyra parvula (Walker, 1865) Brazil (Rio de Janeiro)
Smyra stipatura (Walker, 1858) Brazil (Amazonas, Rio de Janeiro), Suriname

References

Calpinae